San Martino Vescovo di Tours is a Roman Catholic parish church, located in Albiano d'Ivrea in the Metropolitan City of Turin, region of Piedmont, northern Italy.

History 
A church at the site had been present putatively since the fourth century and later dedicated to St Martin of Tours.

The present church building was designed by Francesco Martinez of Messina, great-grandson of Filippo Juvarra, and built during 1775–1780. The bell-tower dates from the 13th century. It has only five bells since Napoleonic forces confiscated bells in excess of this number from campaniles for scrap metal to use in munitions.

References 

Roman Catholic churches completed in 1780
Roman Catholic churches in Ivrea
18th-century Roman Catholic church buildings in Italy
Baroque architecture in Piedmont